The 1936 Boston College Eagles football team represented Boston College as an independent during the 1936 college football season. Led by first-year head coach Gil Dobie, the Eagles compiled a record of 6–1–2. Boston College played home games at Alumni Field in Chestnut Hill, Massachusetts, and Fenway Park in Boston.

Schedule

References

Boston College
Boston College Eagles football seasons
Boston College Eagles football
1930s in Boston